Monstera limitaris is a flowering plant in the genus Monstera of the arum family (Araceae).

Distribution 
It is Native to Costa Rica and Panama.

References 

limitaris